Naimul Islam Ratul simply known as Ratul is a Bangladeshi musician. He won National Film Awards 2018 in the Best Male Playback Singer category.

Career
Ratul became the second runner-up in Meridian-Channel i Khude Gaanraj in 2013. He worked as a playback singer in Putro. This film was released in 2018. He sang the song titled "Jodi Dukkho Chhuye" in this film. For this song he won the national film award. He released his first music video Sajna Re in 2019.

References

External links

Living people
People from Khulna District
Bangladeshi playback singers
21st-century Bangladeshi male singers
21st-century Bangladeshi singers
Best Male Playback Singer National Film Award (Bangladesh) winners
Place of birth missing (living people)
Date of birth missing (living people)
Year of birth missing (living people)